Albert E. Martel was an American government official who served as a Boston police officer, member of the New Hampshire House of Representatives, and deputy collector for the United States Customs Service.

Early life
Martel was born and raised in Berlin, New Hampshire. He attended local schools in Berlin and Suffolk University Law School in Massachusetts. During World War I, Martel served in the United States Navy. On April 13, 1920, he was hired by the Boston Police Department. He worked as a patrolman out of the Dudley Street station. In 1926, Martel was fired for neglect of duty and conduct unbecoming of an officer. He returned to Berlin, where he served as Commander of the White Mountain Post of the Veterans of Foreign Wars.

New Hampshire House of Representatives
In 1933, Martel was elected to a two-year term in the New Hampshire House of Representatives. He represented Ward 4 of Berlin and was a member of the Republican Party. As a member of the House, Martel supported legislation to create licensing requirements for barbers and increase the mileage allowances for members of the House.

United States Customs Service
In 1942, Martel was appointed to a position with the United States Customs Service in Boston. In 1947 he was named Deputy Collector of Customs in charge of the Port of Gloucester, Massachusetts. During his tenure in Gloucester, the port became the largest importer of fish in the United States, with more than 300 ships arriving yearly. In 1959, the port collected a record $1.5 million in customs duties.  Martel retired from the Customs Service on December 21, 1963.

Later life and death
After retiring, Martel remained in Gloucester. He died on November 6, 1965. He was survived by his wife, five sons, and one daughter.

References

1965 deaths
United States Navy personnel of World War I
Boston Police Department officers
Members of the New Hampshire House of Representatives
People from Berlin, New Hampshire
Politicians from Boston
People from Gloucester, Massachusetts
Suffolk University Law School alumni
United States Customs Service personnel